Edward Wooldridge Partridge (13 February 1891 – June 1970) was an English footballer who played for Ebbw Vale, Manchester United and Halifax Town.

Early life
Partridge was born to David and Martha Partridge in 1891 in the village of Lye, near Stourbridge, Worcestershire and spent much of his pre-adult life there.

By the time he was 20 Teddy had moved to Wales and was working underground in the coal mines near Mynyddislwyn.

He signed on (as Edward Wooldridge) to serve in the British Army in World War I, being in the Duke of Wellington's (West Riding) Regiment.

Football career
After the war, Partridge joined Ebbw Vale and scored 36 goals for them in the 1919–20 season. He then joined Manchester United for the next season and was a regular first team selection for the next three years. "...from inside left has developed into one of the fastest and cleverest left wingers playing. Is a regular box o' tricks and a real flyer."

Partridge was placed on the transfer list at the end of the 1928–29 season and in early July 1929 it was announced that he'd been signed by Halifax Town. His stay with Halifax was short-lived, as in November the team and Partridge agreed to part ways. The following year, he was playing at Crewe Alexandra. In 1931, he was made the captain of Darwen.

Personal and later life
Partridge married Nora Roberts in 1922. In 1939 they were living in Stretford, Lancashire, with his occupation listed as aircraft trainee at Metro-Vickers.

When Nora died in Manchester in 1967, Partridge was listed as a retired electrician's labourer, and at his death in early June 1970, he was still at the same address in Aldwick Avenue, Didsbury.

References

External links
Profile at mufcinfo.com

1891 births
1970 deaths
English footballers
Association football forwards
Ebbw Vale F.C. players
Manchester United F.C. players
Halifax Town A.F.C. players
Manchester Central F.C. players
Altrincham F.C. players
Crewe Alexandra F.C. players
British Army personnel of World War I